Eva Seeberg  (28 April 1931 – 12 January 2019) was a Norwegian journalist, novelist and screenwriter. She was born in Oslo. She made her literary debut in 1949 with Undring. Unge skisser. Her novels from the 1960s and 1970s include Det er meg han har vært hos from 1952, Aldri mer alene from 1955, and Tid til ømhet from 1968. She wrote several short story collections, including Lykken bor på Bislett from 1987.

References

1931 births
2019 deaths
Norwegian women novelists
20th-century Norwegian novelists
Norwegian screenwriters
20th-century Norwegian women writers
Writers from Oslo
Norwegian women screenwriters